Tammy Davis is a New Zealand actor, best known for his role as Munter on the hit New Zealand comedy-drama Outrageous Fortune. He grew up in Raetihi, New Zealand. In August 2021, it was announced that he would feature in the 2021 Season of 
Celebrity Treasure Island 2021.

Career
Davis has performed in both film and television, including Black Sheep, Whale Rider and in Taika Waititi's short film Tama Tu. He also starred as Mookie in What Becomes of the Broken Hearted?, the sequel to Once Were Warriors. Davis made his feature film direction debut on the 2015 film, Born to Dance, released in September 2015. He is a host on the breakfast show on George FM.

In 2020, Davis starred as Vice Principal Trev in The Eggplant, a New Zealand-teen-drama crime-comedy series released to TVNZ OnDemand and YouTube.

Filmography

Television

Film

Personal life
Of Māori descent, he identifies with Ngāti Rangi and Atihaunui a Paparangi and is the half brother of Kiwi actor, Julian Arahanga.

He had a long-term relationship with the producer Ainsley Gardiner and they have three daughters. He is now married to Cypress Vivieaere.

References

External links

 Outrageous Fortune official site
 Davis bio
 Tammy Davis on NZ On Screen

New Zealand male film actors
New Zealand male television actors
Living people
New Zealand male Māori actors
Year of birth missing (living people)
Ngāti Rangi people
People from Raetihi